is a sub-kilometer asteroid in a co-orbital configuration with Earth, classified as near-Earth object and potentially hazardous asteroid of the Apollo group. It was discovered by the Wide-field Infrared Survey Explorer space telescope (WISE) on 17 September 2010.

Description 

The orbit was described by  Apostolos Christou and David Asher at the Armagh Observatory in Northern Ireland. The object has an absolute magnitude of 20.5. Observations by the discovering WISE telescope give a diameter of 357 meters and an albedo of 0.084.

 has a horseshoe orbit that allows it to stably share Earth's orbital neighborhood without colliding with it.  It is one of a handful of known asteroids with an Earth-following orbit, a group that includes 3753 Cruithne, and the only known asteroid in an horseshoe orbit with Earth. It is, however, neither an Aten asteroid nor an Apollo asteroid because the semi-major axis of its orbit is neither less than nor greater than 1 AU, but oscillates between approximately 0.996 and 1.004 AU, with a period of about 350 years. In its ~350 yr horseshoe cycle, it never approaches Earth more closely than about 0.15 AU, alternately trailing and leading.

According to various simulations  will remain in this orbit for at least 120,000 years and possibly for more than a million years, which is unusually stable compared to other similar objects.  One reason for this stability is its low orbital eccentricity, .

A precovery of  may have been located in a 2005 Spitzer Space Telescope image.

See also 
3753 Cruithne – a horseshoe companion of the Earth
 – a small asteroid that sometimes temporarily gets caught in Earth orbit
 – a horseshoe companion of the Earth
Natural satellite
 
 
 
 
 
Orbital resonance

References

External links 
 
 
 

419624
419624
419624
419624
419624
20100917